Magnesium wheels are wheels manufactured from alloys which contain mostly magnesium. Magnesium wheels are produced either by casting (metalworking) (where molten metal is introduced into a mold, solidifying within the mold), or by forging (where a prefabricated bar is deformed mechanically).  Magnesium has several key properties that make it an attractive base metal for wheels: lightness; a high damping capacity; and a high specific strength.  Magnesium is the lightest metallic structural material available. It is 1.5 times less dense than aluminium, so magnesium wheels can be designed to be significantly lighter than aluminium alloy wheels, while exhibiting comparable strength. Many competitive racing wheels are made of magnesium alloy.

Cast magnesium wheels
Taking into account their generally inferior quality compared to forged wheels, the main advantage of cast wheels is the relatively low cost of production. And although cast wheels are more affordable than forged wheels, cast wheels are heavier than forged wheels for a given required load. Manufacturing defects found in cast wheels include cavities or porosity and a different metallurgical microstructure, entailing larger grain size. Cast wheels will tend to fracture upon overbearing high-speed impact, whereas forged wheels will tend to bend. Diecast wheels continued to be used in elite racing such as Formula One, IndyCar, BTCC, MotoGP and World Superbike until mid 1990s, when forged wheel technology became preferred.

Forged magnesium wheels
Forged magnesium wheels are manufactured by mechanically deforming (forging) a prefabricated rod using a powerful forging press. Several somewhat different forging techniques exist, all of them comprising a multi-step process/operation. The resultant forging is subsequently machined (lathe-turned and milled) into the final shape of a wheel by removing excess metal from the forged blank. A forged magnesium wheel is 25 percent lighter than cast wheel. The main disadvantage of forged wheels is the high manufacturing cost. Owing to the typically high costs of finished wheels, forged wheels are still rarely purchased by non-professional drivers for regular road use.

But since forged wheels can be designed to be lighter than cast wheels for a given load, forged wheels do offer fuel economy and other distinct advantages. The forging process allows alignment of the metal fibers and optimization of the directional pattern arrangement along the spokes of a wheel. This, along with the smaller grain size, results in superior mechanical properties and performance characteristics that make forged magnesium wheels widely popular both for motor racing and with knowledgeable driving enthusiasts.

History
The original cast magnesium wheels were made beginning in the 1930s and their production continues today. Some of the biggest brands producing magnesium wheels in the past include Halibrand, American Racing, Campagnolo, Cromodora, Ronal, Technomagnesio, and Watanabe. The popularity of magnesium wheels peaked in 1950 -1960. Magnesium wheels from the middle of 20th century are now considered classic and are highly sought by some classic car enthusiasts. However, those magnesium wheels proved to be impractical because they were prone to corrosion and they were mostly used in racing sports. After 1960's magnesium wheels were gradually replaced by aluminium alloy wheels on the mass market, but not from the competition wheels market. Many manufacturers of magnesium wheels are still operating. A lot of companies continued production after the 1960s, although in lower quantities. Modern scientific and engineering developments led to significant improvements in the quality of magnesium wheels, including high-tech anti-corrosion treatment that extends the lifecycle of a wheel to match or even exceed the life cycle of comparable aluminium alloy wheel. Forged magnesium started to displace sand and gravity die-cast magnesium wheels in the mid-1990s. Up to the end of the 90s Marchesini, DYMAG and Marvic we supplying cast wheels to the elite motorbike racing market. DYMAG also supplied all the Lola and Reynard Indycars until 1998.

Common issues
A notable disadvantage historically affecting magnesium wheels was susceptibility to corrosion. Recent improvements in magnesium surface treatment technology have largely resolved the corrosion issues—to the extent that some manufacturers today offer a 10-year warranty.

A common misconception persists regarding the danger caused by magnesium's flammability. But new improved alloys have been developed over the past fifty years, with no reportable incidents of magnesium wheels catching fire. In fact, the U.S. Federal Aviation Administration has conducted wide-ranging tests over the past decade, concluding that the potential flammability of magnesium is no longer a concern—and even ruling  to allow its use in aircraft cabins.

With many challenges solved by modern technological solutions, a number of companies—including Brembo (Marchesini), BBS, OZ, Taneisya, and SMW Engineering—are now producing the next generation of reliable forged magnesium wheels. Additionally, several car and motorcycle manufacturers (Original Equipment Manufacturers, or OEMs) have successfully homologated forged magnesium wheels for use as original equipment. Only a limited number of forgers in the world have the large presses required to manufacture the forgings, from which forged magnesium wheels are machined.

Aftermarket magnesium wheels

mbDESIGN 
mbDESIGN in the middle of Germany present the fist aftermarket KBA homologated forged Magnesium wheel in May 2018. The Frist Design was called MF1 and weighs only 7,2 kg for a 8x19" wheel, a new Milestone for Ultralightwheels.

The sizes start at 17 Inch up to 20 Inch in 2020. The new Design MF2 is again optimized and lighter as all wheels before. For Audi TT RS the wheel in 9x19" Et42 weighs only 6.3 kg, the Performance for all TTRs and RS3 is incredible.

End of 2020 mbDESIGN designed a MF2 Centerlockwheel for an MCLaren 720 that weighs just 7.1 kg in 11.5x20 inches for rear axle and 8x19" with 5.8 kg for front axle.

DYMAG
DYMAG was founded as Competition Wheels Limited in mid-1970s. It was the first company to produce Gravity Diecast Magnesium wheels, which improved mechanical properties over sand cast magnesium wheels. Widely used in Formula One and GP500 (forerunner of MotoGP and World Superbikes). The company changed its name to DYMAG Racing UK Limited during the 1980s. In the mid-1990s forged magnesium displaced die-cast magnesium wheels in elite motorsport. BBS (Washi Beam) and OZ (Tan Ei Sya) exclusively controlled the magnesium forging supply which caused DYMAG to start commercially developing the world's first carbon composite motorcycle wheels in 1995, and subsequently the first carbon composite auto wheels in 2004. The company was liquidated following the Global Financial Crisis in 2009, and was restarted initially as CSA Performance Wheels Limited and renamed DYMAG GROUP LIMITED in 2014. Today DYMAG is a designer and manufacturer of carbon composite wheels for Auto and Moto OEM, racing and aftermarket applications, as well forged aluminium motorcycle racing wheels for BSB and Isle of Man TT.  Magnesium - and carbon - wheels have been largely banned on grounds of cost in World Superbike and many other race series including the IOM TT.

iPE 
iPE launched its first Forged Magnesium racing wheels (MFR-01) for the Porsche GT Series (991 GT2 RS, 991 GT3 RS, 992 GT3) in March, 2022. iPE forged magnesium racing wheels went through rigorous tests under the standards. For instance, TÜV certified (a handful of TÜV-certified magnesium alloy wheels). 

With the engineering design process and technology, the MFR-01 manages to weigh in at only 15.2 lbs/ 6.9kg for 20 x 9.5 inches. It offers ~35% weight reduction over aluminum factory wheels and it’s also lighter than Porsche OEM magnesium wheels. The benefit of lightweight wheels is to reduce unsprung mass and improve vehicles' performance capability, and it is able to reduce weight without sacrificing its strength and safety.

Magnesium wheels are usually applied to race cars, and it can reduce unsprung mass, shorter braking distance, faster acceleration, and improve overall performance. It’s designed especially for the race track and manufactured with the highest standards.

Minilite magnesium wheels
Minilite wheels are 8-spoke design wheels, developed in 1962 for BMC Mini. Magnesium alloy was chosen for weight savings, and Minilite wheels quickly became a popular choice for racing and road use. Designed initially for a specific vehicle, the original 8-spoke pattern was subsequently extended to various sizing dimensions to accommodate a range of vehicles. Used by race teams in Europe and the United States, Minilite was one of the most popular competition wheels of the 1960s and 1970s. Small-scale production of magnesium alloy Minilite wheels continues today.
As of Oct 15, 2020 Magnesium Minilite wheels NLA ex factory.

Speedline wheels
Speedline is a brand of light alloy wheels for OEMs, racing (single-seater and rally), and aftermarket. Some racing wheel models are made from cast magnesium alloy.

Marvic
Marvic is an Italian manufacturer of alloy wheels for motorcycles, including racing team cycles. With its own in-house magnesium foundry, Marvic makes cast and forged magnesium wheels (as well as forged aluminium).  The company also offers wheels for vintage motorcycles and cars, including replicas of historic models, and replica Campagnolo and other wheels in original magnesium alloy.

Washi Beam
Washi Beam Co. is a Japanese manufacturer specializing in forged automotive wheels. Founded in 1971, the company began forging aluminium road wheels in 1984 and magnesium racing wheels in 1992. The company claims to have forged more than 24,000 wheels for Formula 1 teams. The wheels for Formula 1 cars produced by Washi Beam are distributed under BBS trademark. Washi Beam also supplies  numerous automotive original equipment manufacturers.

Tan-ey-sya
Tan-ei-sya Co. is a Japanese manufacturer of automotive alloy wheels, reportedly having an in-house forging facility.  Production of magnesium forged wheels began in 1990, and the company began supplying forgings for manufacturing Formula 1 magnesium wheels in 1993.  TWS Forged brand was launched in 2010 to establish the manufacturer's presence in the aftermarket. Single-part and multi-part forged magnesium wheels are available.

SMW

SMW Group (dba SMW Wheels) is a manufacturer of forged magnesium wheels and wheel forgings (semi-finished). SMW supplies its wheels under private label, along with aluminium forgings to various automobile and motorcycle wheels manufacturers and many motorsports teams, including MotoGP and Formula 1. The company uses a special coating process and offers a long warranty on its products. SMW is also involved in forging jet parts and aircraft components.

See also
 Alloy wheels

References

Automobile wheels